TradingScreen is a US-based financial technology provider of SaaS based trading services for hedge funds, large asset managers, mutual funds, and brokers. TradingScreen's system is broker-neutral, and is designed to handle multiple asset classes and changes in market structure. TradingScreen, Inc. offers electronic trading. The trading platform matches the SaaS based technology from TradeSmart with the ability to connect to Banks, nonbanks, and ECNs.

TradingScreen is headquartered in New York City.

History
TradingScreen was founded in 1999 by Philippe Buhannic and Joseph Ahearn. In 2019, TS launched QUO, a cloud-based ‘software-as-a-service’ platform.

See also 
Buy side
Sell side
Derivatives
Algorithmic trading
Cloud computing

References

Financial software companies
1999 establishments in the United States
Companies based in Manhattan
Privately held companies of the United States
Multinational companies based in New York City
Privately held companies based in New York City